Federal Route 142, or Jalan Mufti Haji Khalil and Jalan Batu Berendam, is a federal road in Melaka, Malaysia. This route used to be known as Melaka State Route M1 on Melaka–Batu Berendam side before recommissioned as a federal road. The Kilometre Zero of the Federal Route 142 starts at Peringgit-Lebuh AMJ interchange.

Features
At most sections, the Federal Route 142 was built under the JKR R5 road standard, allowing maximum speed limit of up to 90 km/h.

List of junctions and towns (south–north)

References

142